Paracharon is a genus of tailless whip scorpion, native to West Africa and northern South America. A single species, Paracharon caecus has been described. It is endemic to Guinea-Bissau. An undescribed species is known from Colombia. It is the most basal known living member of Amblypygi, and the only living member of the Palaeoamblypygi, which also includes the genus Weygoldtina from the Carboniferous of Euramerica and Paracharonopsis from Eocene aged Indian Cambay amber. Both living species are troglobites, having no eyes, with P. caecus living in termite nests, while the undescribed Colombian species was found living in a cave.

References 

Amblypygi
Monotypic arachnid genera
Arthropods of Africa
Animals described in 1921